Benjamin Smith (January 10, 1756 – January 26, 1826) was the 16th Governor of the U.S. state of North Carolina from 1810 to 1811.

Biography
Smith was born in Charles Town in the Province of South Carolina into a socially prominent family, later moving to Brunswick County, North Carolina. His parents were Thomas Smith and Sarah Moore Smith. During the American Revolutionary War, Smith served an aide-de-camp to General George Washington and rose to the rank of colonel in the Continental Army.

In 1784, Smith was elected to the Continental Congress, although it is unclear whether he actually served. He was active in the North Carolina Constitutional Conventions of 1788 and 1789, and served a number of terms in the North Carolina General Assembly, in 1783 (Senate), 1789–1792 (House of Commons), 1792–1800 (Senate), 1801 (House of Commons) 1804–1805 (House of Commons) and 1806–1810 (Senate). From 1795 to 1799, Smith was the Speaker of the North Carolina Senate.

During his political career, Smith also sat on the Board of Trustees of the University of North Carolina at Chapel Hill and donated 20,000 acres (81 km2) of land for the university's endowment; he chaired the trustees during his term as governor.

As of 1789, he owned 221 slaves.

In 1810, aligned with the Democratic-Republican Party (he had earlier had Federalist leanings), Smith was elected governor by the North Carolina General Assembly. He served only a single one-year term, and emphasized reform of the state's criminal code and penitentiary system. Although Smith did seek re-election to the governor's seat in 1811, he polled behind William Hawkins on the first ballot and withdrew himself from consideration. He later returned to the North Carolina Senate in 1816.

Smith died in Smithville, North Carolina in 1826 and is buried at the St. Philip's Church near Wilmington. Smithville, now known as Southport, is situated a few miles outside of Wilmington along the Cape Fear River.

References

 Biographical Directory of the Governors of the United States, 1789–1978, Robert Sobel and John Raimo, eds. Westport, CT: Meckler Books, 1978.
 National Governors Association

1756 births
1826 deaths
Adjutants General of North Carolina
Governors of North Carolina
North Carolina state senators
Members of the North Carolina House of Representatives
North Carolina Democratic-Republicans
Democratic-Republican Party state governors of the United States
American slave owners
Benjamin